Party is a unreleased Indian comedy film written and directed by Venkat Prabhu and produced by T. Siva. The film stars Jai, Jayaram, Shiva, Shaam, Sathyaraj, Ramya Krishnan and Regina Cassandra, with Sanchita Shetty, Nivetha Pethuraj, Nandha Durairaj, Nassar and Chandran appear in supporting roles. After the release of his seventh directorial and debut production venture, it was announced that director Venkat Prabhu will do a film for Amma Creations banner of T.Siva which is celebrating its 25th year in film industry. Despite having completed filming, the film remains unreleased.

Cast 

 Jai as "Zero Error" Charlie: a small-time kidnapper
 Shiva as Babu Murali / Bob Marley: a drug peddler
 Sathyaraj as Karnan / Ironfist Ayyanar
 Jayaram as Rajashekhara Pandian / RSP: a casino kingpin
 Shaam as a Hitman: a man with no name
 Ramya Krishnan as Abhirami: a socialite
 Regina Cassandra as Madhu: player
 Sanchita Shetty as Adithi: a mastermind
 Nivetha Pethuraj as Kalki: Software
 Nassar as Benjamin Button: a businessman
 Chandran as Raghu: a software updater
 Suresh as Chidhambaram: an imposter

Production 
Party is entirely filmed in the Fiji Islands. The project was publicly announced in a promotional event for the film Gemini Ganeshanum Suruli Raajanum. For this film, director Prabhu decided to pick Premgi Amaren to compose the film's soundtrack and the background score entirely, replacing his usual choice, Yuvan Shankar Raja who composed for all the director's ventures. It was noted that Premgi earlier composed one song in Chennai 600028 film and also doing the additional background score of the director's previous films as well. In an interview, Chandran added that, the movie's filming is like going on an excursion and the director is handling the big star cast with absolute ease. Rajesh Yadav and Praveen were selected as the cinematographer and editor respectively, continuing their association with the director where they worked together in Chennai 600028 II. Stunt Silva signed in as stunt choreographer for this project. A promotional teaser was released on 13 December 2017, and was followed by two more that introduced the cast and revealed their respective characters.

Soundtrack 

Unlike Prabhu's previous projects which had Yuvan Shankar Raja composing the film's soundtrack and score, Premgi Amaren both composed the film's soundtrack and score as well for this project. A single was launched on 2 July 2018, which features actors Suriya and Karthi making their second ventures as playback singers.

Release 
Despite filming having completed and the film cleared by the censor board, the film remains unreleased for undisclosed reasons, although the makers were adamant on a theatrical release only, rather than direct-to-streaming.

References

External links 

Upcoming films
Films shot in Fiji
Films directed by Venkat Prabhu
Indian comedy films
Films postponed due to the COVID-19 pandemic
Films scored by Premgi Amaren
Film productions suspended due to the COVID-19 pandemic
Unreleased Tamil-language films